Wila Qullu (Aymara wila red, blood, qullu mountain, "red mountain", hispanicized spelling Wila Khollu, Wila Kkollu) is a mountain in the Bolivian Andes, about  high. It is located in the Oruro Department, Sabaya Province, Sabaya Municipality, Julo Canton. Wila Qullu lies south-east of the volcano Pukintika and north-west of the mountain Phaq'u Q'awa.

See also
 Kimsa Chata
List of mountains in the Andes

References 

Mountains of Oruro Department